Chamber of Commerce Building, also known as the North Greenville College Building, is a historic office building located at Greenville, South Carolina. It was built in 1925, and is a ten-story rectangular brick sheathed steel frame building. The Chicago School style skyscraper consists of a two-story base with Neoclassical detailing, a seven-story shaft, and a roof story that features tall arched windows and a brick and stone frieze with transoms and stone panels.

It was added to the National Register of Historic Places in 1982.

References

Office buildings on the National Register of Historic Places in South Carolina
Commercial buildings completed in 1925
National Register of Historic Places in Greenville, South Carolina
Skyscrapers in South Carolina
Skyscraper office buildings in South Carolina
Chicago school architecture in the United States